The Ravine Bluffs Development was commissioned in 1915 by Frank Lloyd Wright's attorney,  Sherman Booth Jr.  It is located in Glencoe, Illinois. Six houses, three poured concrete sculptures, and one bridge were built. Five of the houses were for rent when built. All 5 rental houses share the same basic floor plan as "A Fireproof House for $5000".

Client's home:
 Sherman Booth House

Rentals:
 Charles R. Perry House
 Hollis R. Root House
 William F. Kier House
 Lute F. and Daniel Kissam House
 William F. Ross House - differs in design from the other 4 rentals, has fireplace to the side - was purchased by architect John Eifler and was restored from 2011-2014.

Bridge
The Ravine Bluffs Development Bridge, also known as the Sylvan Road Bridge, was a bridge designed by Frank Lloyd Wright and located at the northeastern entrance of the Development. It crosses over the ravine from which the project gets its name. In the 1980s, the bridge was rebuilt. It is one of only 2 bridges designed by Wright to be built. The other bridge is a residential bridge that spans Bear Run to access the residence known as Fallingwater.

References

Further reading

 (S.185-192)

External links

Ravine Bluffs Development Markers and Bridge on dgunning.org

Ravine Bluffs Development Corner Markers (1915), Glencoe, Illinois. Color photographs.
Ravine Bluffs Markers and Bridge on appraisercitywide.com
Booth House on dgunning.org
"Sherman Booth House" Waymark
Sherman Booth House on peterbeers.net
Booth House on appraisercitywide.com
Kier House on dgunning.org
"Kier House AKA Ellis House" Waymark
Kier House on appraisercitywide.com
Kissam House on dgunning.org
"Kissam House" Waymark
Kissam House on appraisercitywide.com
Perry House on dgunning.org
"Perry House" Waymark
Perry House on appraisercitywide.com
Root House on dgunning.org
"Root House AKA Gilfillan House" Waymark
Root House on peterbeers.net
Root House on appraisercitywide.com
Ross House on dgunning.org
William F. Ross House on landmarks.org
"Ross House AKA Finch House" Waymark
A Chicago Suburb Could Lose a Wright
Ross House on appraisercitywide.com

Frank Lloyd Wright buildings
Glencoe, Illinois
Historic American Engineering Record in Illinois
Houses in Cook County, Illinois
Residential buildings completed in 1915
1915 establishments in Illinois